These are the Billboard Hot 100 number-one singles of 1971.

That year, 16 acts hit number one for the first time, such as Dawn, the Osmonds, Janis Joplin, Honey Cone, Carole King, the Raiders, James Taylor, the Bee Gees, Linda McCartney, Donny Osmond, Rod Stewart, Isaac Hayes, and Melanie. Janis Joplin became the second artist to earn a number one song posthumously after her death in October 1970. Paul McCartney, Cher, and Donny Osmond, having already hit number one with the Beatles, Sonny & Cher, and the Osmonds, respectively, also earn their first number one songs as solo acts.

Chart history

Number-one artists

See also
1971 in music
List of Billboard number-one singles
Cashbox Top 100 singles of 1971

Sources
Fred Bronson's Billboard Book of Number 1 Hits, 5th Edition
Joel Whitburn's Top Pop Singles 1955-2008, 12 Edition
Joel Whitburn Presents the Billboard Hot 100 Charts: The Seventies
Additional information obtained can be verified within Billboard's online archive services and print editions of the magazine.

References

1971 record charts
1971